Stadiametric rangefinding, or the stadia method, is a technique of measuring distances with a telescopic instrument. The term stadia comes from a Greek unit of length Stadion (equal to 600 Greek feet, pous) which was the typical length of a sports stadium of the time. Stadiametric rangefinding is used for surveying and in the telescopic sights of firearms, artillery pieces, or tank guns, as well as some binoculars and other optics.  It is still widely used in long-range military sniping, but in many professional applications it is being replaced with microwave, infrared, or laser rangefinding methods.  Although much easier to use, electronic rangefinders can give away the shooter's position to a well-equipped adversary, and the need for accurate range estimation existed for much longer than electronic rangefinders small and rugged enough to be suitable for military use.

Principle 

The stadia method is based upon the principle of similar triangles.  This means that, for a triangle with a given angle, the ratio of opposite side length to adjacent side length (tangent) is constant.  By using a reticle with marks of a known angular spacing, the principle of similar triangles can be used to find either the distance to objects of known size or the size of objects at a known distance.  In either case, the known parameter is used, in conjunction with the angular measurement, to derive the length of the other side.

Stadiametric rangefinding often uses the milliradian ("mil" or "mrad") as the unit of angular measurement. Since a radian is defined as the angle formed when the length of a circular arc equals the radius of the circle, a milliradian is the angle formed when the length of a circular arc equals 1/1000 of the radius of the circle. For telescopic angles, the approximations of  greatly simplify the trigonometry, enabling one to scale objects measured in milliradians through a telescope by a factor of 1000 for distance or height. An object 5 meters high, for example, will cover 1 mrad at 5000 meters, or 5 mrad at 1000 meters, or 25 mrad at 200 meters.  Since the radian expresses a ratio, it is independent of the units used; an object 6 feet high covering 1 mrad will be 6000 feet distant.

In practice, it can be seen that rough approximations may be made with a right triangle whose base (b) is equal to the distance of the 'rangefinder' from the eye; with the aperture (a) being the hole through which the target is sighted – the apex of this triangle being on the surface of the user's eye.

For a standard distance from the eye (b) of 28" (71.12 cm); this being the common length of an archer's draw:
28" × 1 milliradian ≈ 0.028" (0.071 cm) -- stadia factor 1000
10 milliradians ≈ 0.280" (0.711 cm) -- stadia factor x 100
100 milliradians ≈ 2.80" (7.112 cm) -- stadia factor x10

The approximate range of an object one foot (30.48 cm) in height covering roughly 100 milliradians is 10 feet (3.048 m) or: 
Range (r) = approximate height of object (h) × (1000 ÷ aperture in milliradians (a))
r = h(1000/a) → where r and h are identical units, and a is in milliradians.
r = h/a → where r and h are identical units, and a is in radians

The above formula functions for any system of linear measure provided r and h are calculated with the same units.

Surveying
Stadia readings used in surveying can be taken with modern instruments such as transits, theodolites, plane-table alidades and levels.  When using the stadia measuring method, a level staff is held so that it appears between two stadia marks visible on the instrument's reticle.  The stadia rod has measurements written on it that can be read through the telescope of the instrument, providing a known remote height for the distance calculations.

An instrument equipped for stadia work has two horizontal stadia marks spaced equidistant from the center crosshair of the reticle.  The interval between stadia marks in most surveying instruments is 10 mrad and gives a stadia interval factor of 100.  The distance between the instrument and a stadia rod can be determined simply by multiplying the measurement between the stadia hairs (known as the stadia interval) by 100.  

The instrument must be level for this method to work directly.  If the instrument line of sight is inclined relative to the staff, the horizontal and vertical distance components must be determined.  Some instruments have additional graduations on a vertical circle to assist with these inclined measurements.  These graduated circles, known as stadia circles, provide the value of the horizontal and the vertical measurements as a percentage of the inclined stadia measurement.

This system is sufficiently precise for locating topographic details such as rivers, bridges, buildings, and roads when an accuracy of 1/500 (0.2%, 2000ppm) is acceptable.  Stadia readings are also used to provide repeated, independent observations for improved accuracy and to provide error checking against blunders in levelling.

The stadia method of distance measurement is primarily historical for surveying purposes, as distance nowadays is mostly measured by electronic or taping methods. Total station instruments do not have stadia lines marked on the reticle.  Traditional methods are still used in areas where modern instruments are not common or by aficionados to antique surveying methods.

See also
Milliradian
Rangefinder
Stadimeter

References 
Raymond Davis, Francis Foote, Joe Kelly, Surveying, Theory and Practice, McGraw-Hill Book Company, 1966 LC 64-66263

External links 
 
 "Technique of Fire", Ch. 5 of US Army FM 23-11: 90mm Recoilless Rifle, M67 — demonstrates stadiametric rangefinding in an anti-tank weapon sight
 Mils / MOA and the Range Equations by Robert Simeone
Measuring instruments
Length, distance, or range measuring devices